The following lists events that happened during 1808 in Chile.

Incumbents
Royal Governor of Chile: Luis Muñoz de Guzmán(-11 February), Francisco Antonio García Carrasco(February-)

Events

Births
8 July - Buenaventura Cousiño Jorquera, member of Chilean parliament (d. 1855)

Deaths
11 February - Luis Muñoz de Guzmán, Royal Governor of Chile (b. 1735)

References

 
Chile